The 2017 Connecticut Open (also known as the 2017 Connecticut Open presented by United Technologies for sponsorship reasons) was a tennis tournament played on outdoor hard courts. It was the 49th edition of the Connecticut Open, and part of the Premier Series of the 2017 WTA Tour. It took place at the Cullman-Heyman Tennis Center in New Haven, Connecticut, United States, from August 20 through August 26. It was the last event of the 2017 US Open Series before the 2017 US Open.

Points and prize money

Point distribution

Prize money

Singles main-draw entrants

Seeds

 Rankings are as of 14 August 2017

Other entrants
The following players received wildcards into the singles main draw:
  Eugenie Bouchard
  Sloane Stephens (wrist injury)

The following players received entry from the qualifying draw:
  Ana Bogdan
  Jana Čepelová
  Kirsten Flipkens
  Magda Linette
  Elise Mertens
  Kristýna Plíšková

The following player received entry as a lucky loser:
  Christina McHale

Withdrawals
Before the tournament
  Timea Bacsinszky →replaced by  Alizé Cornet
  Sloane Stephens →replaced by  Christina McHale
  Samantha Stosur →replaced by  Kateřina Siniaková

During the tournament
  Zhang Shuai

Doubles main-draw entrants

Seeds

Rankings are as of 14 August 2017

Other entrants
The following pair received a wildcard into the doubles main draw:
  Eugenie Bouchard /  Sloane Stephens

The following pair received entry as alternates:
  Nicole Melichar /  Anna Smith

Withdrawals
Before the tournament
  Sloane Stephens

Finals

Singles

  Daria Gavrilova defeated  Dominika Cibulková, 4–6, 6–3, 6–4

Doubles

  Gabriela Dabrowski /  Xu Yifan defeated  Ashleigh Barty /  Casey Dellacqua, 3–6, 6–3, [10–8]
Hadiah Terbesar 4D 10 Juta

References

External links
 WTA tournament draws

 
Connecticut Open by year
2017 WTA Tour
2017 US Open Series
August 2017 sports events in the United States